The wolfsnout goby (Luposicya lupus), also known as the dognsout goby or cup-sponge goby, is a species of goby native to the Indian Ocean and the western Pacific Ocean. This species grows to a length of  SL. This species is the only known member of its genus. It spans benthically and is a solitary species.

References

External links
 

Gobiidae
Monotypic fish genera
Fish described in 1959